Ptychoptera sculleni is a species of phantom crane flies in the family Ptychopteridae. It can be found in the far western portion of the United States, namely the states of California, Oregon, and Washington.

References

Ptychopteridae
Articles created by Qbugbot
Insects described in 1943